Abdel Nadini (born 14 September 1961) is a Moroccan former tennis player. 

He has lived in Royan, France, since 1986.

Career
Nadini was once, in the eighties, the second-highest ranked tennis player from Morocco. He competed at the 1987 Mediterranean Games in Latakia, where he won a doubles silver medals partnering with Arafat Chekrouni.

He played in four Davis Cup ties for Morocco from 1984 to 1989 and won one of his seven rubbers.

References

1961 births
Living people
Moroccan male tennis players
Mediterranean Games silver medalists for Morocco
Mediterranean Games medalists in tennis
Competitors at the 1987 Mediterranean Games
People from Royan
Sportspeople from Charente-Maritime
20th-century Moroccan people
21st-century Moroccan people